Antonis Panagi (born 26 August 1983) is a Cypriot football player who currently plays as a midfielder for Omonia Aradippou in the Cypriot Second Division.

He played for Nea Salamina, Apollon Limassol, Alki Larnaca, AEK Larnaca and Olympiakos Nicosia.

External links

1983 births
Living people
Cypriot footballers
Olympiakos Nicosia players
Apollon Limassol FC players
Nea Salamis Famagusta FC players
Alki Larnaca FC players
Omonia Aradippou players
Cypriot First Division players
Cyprus under-21 international footballers
Association football midfielders